The 2009 EMCO Gears Classic was the sixth round of the 2009 Rolex Sports Car Series season. It took place at Mid-Ohio Sports Car Course on June 20, 2009.

Race results
Class Winners in bold.

EMCO Gears Classic
EMCO Gears Classic
Motorsport in Ohio